Jeffrey Joseph "J. J." Dielman (born December 16, 1993) is a former American football guard. He played college football at Utah, and was drafted by the Cincinnati Bengals in the fifth round of the 2017 NFL Draft.

High school career
Dielman played for Desert Vista High School in Arizona, and was named First-team all-state, as well as all-section III South and all-city. Desert Vista High was the 2011 Arizona D1 state champion. He was a team captain for his high school football team.

College career
Deilman played college football for the  Utah Utes, where he was a three-year starter on the offensive line, starting in 31 consecutive games. He played right tackle his first three seasons (26 games) before moving to the center position as a senior (5 games). He started 13 games as a junior at right tackle, earning  second-team All-Pac-12 Conference honors. Deilman started all 13 games as a sophomore at right tackle.

Professional career

Cincinnati Bengals
Dielman was drafted by the Cincinnati Bengals in the fifth round, 176th overall, in the 2017 NFL Draft. He was waived on September 2, 2017.

Los Angeles Rams
On September 3, 2017, Dielman was claimed off waivers by the Los Angeles Rams. He was waived on September 12, 2017.

Cincinnati Bengals (second stint)
On September 14, 2017, Dielman was re-signed to the Bengals practice squad.

Denver Broncos
On December 16, 2017, Dielman was signed by the Denver Broncos off the Bengals' practice squad, following several injuries to the Broncos' offensive line.

On September 1, 2018, Dielman was waived/injured by the Broncos and was placed on injured reserve. He was released on September 11, 2018.

Seattle Seahawks
On October 23, 2018, Dielman was signed to the Seattle Seahawks practice squad, but was released a week later.

Los Angeles Rams (second stint)
On November 7, 2018, Dielman was signed to the Los Angeles Rams practice squad.

New England Patriots
On July 26, 2019, Dielman signed with the New England Patriots. However three days later, Dielman announced his retirement from the NFL.

Personal life
Dielman is cousins with former Pro Bowl guard Kris Dielman.

References

External links
 Seattle Seahawks bio
Utah Utes bio

1993 births
Living people
Sportspeople from Phoenix, Arizona
Players of American football from Phoenix, Arizona
American football offensive tackles
American football centers
Utah Utes football players
Cincinnati Bengals players
Los Angeles Rams players
Denver Broncos players
Seattle Seahawks players
New England Patriots players
Utah Utes football coaches